Hunningolla is the debut solo album of the Finnish singer-songwriter Erin. It was released on 20 May 2011. In its first week of release, the album peaked at number four on the Finnish Album Chart.

Singles

Four singles were released from the album. First of those, "Vanha nainen hunningolla", peaked at number eight on the Finnish Singles Chart.  "Popeda", "Vanha sydän" and "On elämä laina" failed to chart.

Track listing

Chart performance

References

2011 debut albums
Erin Anttila albums
Finnish-language albums